Sylvia Ardyn Boone (September 30, 1940 - April 27, 1993) was an African-American art historian specializing in African art, female imagery, women's arts and masks. In 1988, she became the first African-American woman to receive tenure at Yale University.

Biography
Sylvia Ardyn Boone was born September 30, 1940. She attended Brooklyn College as an undergraduate and received a graduate degree in social sciences from Columbia University.

After a period at the University of Ghana, she returned to the United States and earned degrees in art history at Yale University in the 1970s. Her doctoral dissertation won the Blanshard Prize in 1979.

She joined the faculty of Yale in 1979, and received tenure in 1988. Topics of her courses included  African art and the aesthetics of female imagery in African art.

In 1989, Boone was active in the organization of the commemoration of the 150th anniversary of the 1839 Amistad Affair.

Death and legacy
Boone died April 27, 1993. In 1996, Yale University's History of Art and African and African-American Studies departments awarded the first Sylvia Ardyn Boone Prize. It has been awarded annually since then.

Works
 (Random House, 1974) 
 (Yale University Press, 1990)
 (UMI Dissertation Services, 1997)

External links
 Sylvia Ardyn Boone papers at the Rare Book and Manuscript Library, Columbia University, New York

References

1993 deaths
Yale University faculty
Brooklyn College alumni
Columbia University alumni
African-American academics
Women art historians
1941 births
American art historians
20th-century African-American people